The Truman Show is a 1998 American science fiction satirical psychological comedy-drama film directed by Peter Weir, produced by Scott Rudin, Andrew Niccol, Edward S. Feldman, and Adam Schroeder, and written by Niccol. The film stars Jim Carrey as Truman Burbank, a man who grew up living an ordinary life that—unbeknownst to him—takes place on a large set populated by actors for a television show about him. The supporting cast includes Laura Linney, Ed Harris, Noah Emmerich, Natascha McElhone, Holland Taylor, Paul Giamatti, and Brian Delate.

Unlike the finished product, Niccol's spec script was more of a science-fiction thriller, with the story set in New York City. Scott Rudin purchased the script and set up production at Paramount Pictures. Brian De Palma was to direct before Weir signed as director, making the film for $60 million—$20 million less than the original estimate. Niccol rewrote the script while the crew was waiting for Carrey to sign. The majority of filming took place at Seaside, Florida, a master-planned community located in the Florida Panhandle.

The Truman Show held its world premiere in Los Angeles on June 1, 1998, and was released in North America on June 5. The film was a financial success, debuting to critical acclaim, and earned numerous nominations at the 71st Academy Awards, 56th Golden Globe Awards, 52nd British Academy Film Awards, and 25th Saturn Awards. The Truman Show has been analyzed as an exploration of simulated reality, existentialism, surveillance, religion, metaphilosophy, privacy, and reality television, and described as a genre-blending that features elements of dystopian fiction, metafiction, psychological drama, romantic comedy, satire, and social science fiction.

Plot 
Truman Burbank is the unsuspecting star of The Truman Show, a reality television program filmed 24/7 through thousands of hidden cameras and broadcast to a worldwide audience. Christof, the show's creator and executive producer, seeks to capture Truman's authentic emotions and give audiences a relatable everyman. Truman has been the star of the show since he was born and the studio officially adopted him.

As Truman was selected from birth following an unwanted pregnancy, Christof claims that Truman came to be adopted not just by the show, but by the whole "world". Truman's hometown of Seahaven Island is a complete set built within an enormous dome, populated by crew members and actors who highlight the product placements that generate revenue for the show. The elaborate set allows Christof to control almost every aspect of Truman's life, including the weather.

To prevent Truman from discovering his false reality, Christof manufactures scenarios that dissuade Truman's desire for exploration, such as the "death" of his father in a sea storm to instill aquaphobia, and by constantly broadcasting and printing messages of the dangers of traveling and the virtues of staying home. However, Christof cannot predict all of Truman's actions. During his college years, Truman was intended to fall in love with and marry co-student Meryl, but fell for Sylvia, an extra.

Although Sylvia was quickly removed from the show before she could disclose its nature to Truman, he continues to remember her, and secretly dreams of a life with Sylvia outside of his marriage to Meryl. To this end, he seeks to travel to Fiji, where he was told Sylvia's family moved. In the real world, Sylvia is a part of "Free Truman", an activist group that seeks to cancel the show and have Truman released.

As the show approaches its 30th anniversary, Truman begins discovering unusual elements, such as a spotlight falling out of the sky in front of his house and a radio channel that precisely describes his movements. These events are punctuated by the reappearance of his father, who had infiltrated the set, with the crew believing the actor was somehow recast. Truman begins questioning his life and realizes that the city somehow revolves around him. Meryl's stress from attempting to uphold the charade in the face of Truman's growing skepticism and hostility causes their marriage to deteriorate.

One day, Truman takes Meryl by surprise by going on an impromptu road trip, but increasingly implausible emergencies block their way. During an argument ignited by Meryl attempting to advertise a product, Truman determines that Meryl is a part of the conspiracy and holds her at knife-point; she breaks character and is taken off the show. Hoping to bring Truman back to a controllable state, Christof re-introduces Truman's father to the show properly, under the guise of having lost his memory after the boating accident. This helps the show regain the ratings lead with audiences, and Truman seems to return to his routines, except he begins sleeping in his basement. One night, Truman secretly disappears through a makeshift tunnel in his basement, forcing Christof to temporarily suspend the broadcast for the first time in its history. Audiences around the world are captivated by this unexpected event, and record numbers tune in.

Christof orders a citywide search for Truman and is soon forced to "cue the sun" and break the production's day-night cycle to optimize the search. Christof discovers Truman sailing away from Seahaven on a small boat, having conquered his fear of water. He resumes the transmission and, unable to fetch Truman by boat, creates a violent storm in an attempt to capsize Truman’s boat. After nearly drowning Truman but failing to break his spirit, Christof ends the storm. Truman continues to sail until his boat strikes the wall of the dome.

Initially horrified, Truman discovers a nearby staircase leading to an exit door. As Truman contemplates leaving his world, Christof speaks directly to Truman through a speaker system and tries to persuade him to stay, claiming that there is no more truth in the real world than in his artificial one, where he would have nothing to fear. After a moment of reflection, Truman utters his catchphrase: "In case I don't see you... good afternoon, good evening, and good night", bows to his audience and exits. The viewers celebrate his escape, and Sylvia races to greet him. Christof's supervisors finally end the program on a shot of the open exit door, leaving Christof to mourn over the truth of his defeat. Truman's fans—the viewers of the show—cheer upon his successful escape and then, after transmission ceases, ask what else is on television.

Cast
 Jim Carrey as Truman Burbank
Robin Williams was considered for the role. Still, Weir cast Carrey after seeing him in Ace Ventura: Pet Detective because Carrey's performance reminded him of Charlie Chaplin. Carrey took the opportunity to proclaim himself as a dramatic actor, rather than being typecast in comedic roles. Carrey, who was then normally paid $20 million per film, agreed to do The Truman Show for $12 million. Carrey also said it was the fastest that he ever accepted a role. Carrey and Weir initially found working together on set difficult (Carrey's contract gave him the power to demand rewrites), but Weir was impressed with Carrey's improvisational skills, and the two became more interactive. The scene in which Truman declares "this planet Trumania of the Burbank galaxy" to the bathroom mirror was Carrey's idea.
 Laura Linney as Hannah Gill, acting as Meryl Burbank, Truman's wife
Linney heavily studied Sears catalogs from the 1950s to develop her character's poses.
 Ed Harris as Christof
Dennis Hopper was originally cast in the role, but he left in April 1997 (during filming) over "creative differences". Harris was a last-minute replacement. Hopper later stated that he was fired after two days because Weir and producer Scott Rudin had made a deal that if they did not both approve of Hopper's performance, they would replace him. A number of other actors had turned down the role after Hopper's departure. Harris considered making Christof a hunchback, but Weir did not like the idea.
 Noah Emmerich as Louis Coltrane, playing Marlon, Truman's best friend
Emmerich has said, "My character is in a lot of pain. He feels really guilty about deceiving Truman. He's had a serious drug addiction for many years. Been in and out of rehab." Very little of this is shown in the finished film, but several deleted scenes depict Louis actively expressing guilt over Truman's situation, and in one sequence, he spots Truman during his escape and purposely says nothing. His name is an amalgamation of two jazz musicians, Louis Armstrong and John Coltrane, and in one scene, he plays the trumpet.
 Natascha McElhone as Sylvia, playing Lauren Garland, Truman's college schoolmate
 Holland Taylor as Alanis Montclair, playing Angela Montclair, Truman's mother
 Brian Delate as Walter Moore, playing Truman's father Kirk Burbank
 Paul Giamatti as Simeon, the control room director
 Peter Krause as an unnamed actor playing Laurence, Truman's boss
 Harry Shearer as Mike Michaelson, a TV talk-show host
Philip Baker Hall as the network executive
 Joel McKinnon Miller as a garage attendant

Production

Andrew Niccol completed a one-page film treatment titled The Malcolm Show in May 1991. The original draft was more in tone of a science fiction thriller, with the story set in New York City. Niccol stated, "I think everyone questions the authenticity of their lives at certain points. It's like when kids ask if they're adopted." In the fall of 1993, producer Scott Rudin purchased the script for slightly over $1 million. Paramount Pictures agreed to distribute. Part of the deal called for Niccol to make his directing debut, though Paramount executives felt the estimated $80 million budget would be too high for him. In addition, Paramount wanted to go with an A-list director, paying Niccol extra money "to step aside". Brian De Palma was under negotiations to direct before he left United Talent Agency in March 1994. Directors who were considered after De Palma's departure included Tim Burton, Sam Raimi, Terry Gilliam, David Cronenberg, Barry Sonnenfeld and Steven Spielberg before Peter Weir signed on in early 1995, following a recommendation of Niccol. Bryan Singer wanted to direct but Paramount decided to go with the more experienced Weir.

Weir wanted the film to be funnier, feeling that Niccol's script was too dark, and declaring, "where [Niccol] had it depressing, I could make it light. It could convince audiences they could watch a show in this scope 24/7." Niccol wrote sixteen drafts of the script before Weir considered the script ready for filming. Later in 1995, Jim Carrey signed to star, but because of commitments with The Cable Guy and Liar Liar, he would not be ready to start filming for at least another year. Weir felt Carrey was perfect for the role and opted to wait for another year rather than recast the role. Niccol rewrote the script twelve times, while Weir created a fictionalized book about the show's history. He envisioned backstories for the characters and encouraged actors to do the same.

Weir scouted locations in Eastern Florida but was dissatisfied with the landscapes. Sound stages at Universal Studios were reserved for the story's setting of Seahaven before Weir's wife Wendy Stites introduced him to Seaside, Florida, a "master-planned community" located in the Florida Panhandle. Pre-production offices were immediately opened in Seaside, where the majority of filming took place. The scenes of Truman's house were filmed at a residence owned by the Gaetz family, which included Florida State Senator Don Gaetz and U.S. representative Matt Gaetz. Other scenes were shot at Paramount Studios in Los Angeles, California. Norman Rockwell paintings and 1960s postcards were used as inspiration for the film's design. Weir, Peter Biziou and Dennis Gassner researched surveillance techniques for certain shots.

Filming took place from December 1996 to April 1998. The overall look was influenced by television images, particularly commercials: Many shots have characters leaning into the lens with their eyes wide open, and the interior scenes are heavily lit because Weir wanted to remind viewers that "in this world, everything was for sale". Those involved in visual effects work found the film somewhat difficult to make because 1997 was the year many visual effects companies were trying to convert to computer-generated imagery (CGI). CGI was used to create the upper halves of some of the larger buildings in the film's downtown set. Craig Barron, one of the effects supervisors, said that these digital models did not have to look as detailed and weathered as they normally would in a film because of the artificial look of the entire town, although they did imitate slight blemishes found in the physical buildings.

Soundtrack

Themes

Media

In 2008, Popular Mechanics named The Truman Show as one of the 10 most prophetic science fiction films. Journalist Erik Sofge argued that the story reflects the falseness of reality television. "Truman simply lives, and the show's popularity is its straightforward voyeurism. And, like Big Brother, Survivor, and every other reality show on the air, none of his environment is actually real." He deemed it an eerie coincidence that Big Brother made its debut a year after the film's release, and he also compared the film to the 2003 program The Joe Schmo Show: "Unlike Truman, Matt Gould could see the cameras, but all of the other contestants were paid actors, playing the part of various reality-show stereotypes. While Matt eventually got all of the prizes in the rigged contest, the show's central running joke was in the same existential ballpark as The Truman Show." Weir declared, "There has always been this question: Is the audience getting dumber? Or are we filmmakers patronizing them? Is this what they want? Or is this what we're giving them? But the public went to my film in large numbers. And that has to be encouraging."

Ronald Bishop's paper in the Journal of Communication Enquiry suggests The Truman Show showcased the power of the media. Truman's life inspires audiences around the world, meaning their lives are controlled by his. Bishop commented, "In the end, the power of the media is affirmed rather than challenged. In the spirit of Antonio Gramsci's concept of hegemony, these films and television programs co-opt our enchantment (and disenchantment) with the media and sell it back to us."

In her essay "Reading The Truman Show inside out" Simone Knox argues that the film itself tries to blur the objective perspective and the show-within-the-film. Knox also draws a floor plan of the camera angles of the first scene.

Psychoanalytic interpretation
An essay published in the International Journal of Psychoanalysis analyzed Truman as

For the 2022 Cannes Film Festival, its official poster pays homage to the film and its final scene with their website stating that "Peter Weir and Andrew Niccol’s The Truman Show (1998) is a modern reflection of Plato’s cave and the decisive scene urges viewers to not only experience the border between reality and its representation but to ponder the power of fiction, between manipulation and catharsis."

Religious interpretation
Benson Y. Parkinson of the Association for Mormon Letters compared the megalomaniacal Hollywood producer Christof to Lucifer. According to Parkinson, the conversation between Truman and Marlon at the bridge can be compared to one between Moses and God in the Book of Moses.

In C.S. Lewis and Narnia for Dummies by Rich Wagner, Christof is compared with Screwtape, the eponymous character of the 1942 The Screwtape Letters by C. S. Lewis.

Similarity to Utopia
Parallels can be drawn from Thomas More's 1516 book Utopia, in which More describes an island with only one entrance and only one exit. Only those who belonged to this island knew how to navigate their way through the treacherous openings safely and unharmed. This situation is similar to The Truman Show because there are limited entryways into the world that Truman knows. Truman does not belong to this utopia into which he has been implanted, and childhood trauma rendered him frightened of the prospect of ever leaving this small community. Utopian models of the past tended to be full of like-minded individuals who shared much in common, comparable to More's Utopia and real-life groups such as the Shakers and the Oneida Community. It is clear that the people in Truman's world are like-minded in their common effort to keep him oblivious to reality. The suburban "picket fence" appearance of the show's set is reminiscent of the "American Dream" of the 1950s. The "American Dream" concept in Truman's world serves as an attempt to keep him happy and ignorant.

Release
Originally set for August 8, 1997, the film's theatrical release was pushed back initially to November 14, 1997, and then to the summer of 1998. NBC purchased broadcast rights in December 1997, roughly eight months before the film's release. In March 2000, Turner Broadcasting System purchased the rights and now often airs the film on TBS.

Critical response
On review aggregator Rotten Tomatoes, The Truman Show holds a 95% approval rating based on 151 reviews, with an average rating of 8.5/10. The website's critics consensus reads, "A funny, tender, and thought-provoking film, The Truman Show is all the more noteworthy for its remarkably prescient vision of runaway celebrity culture and a nation with an insatiable thirst for the private details of ordinary lives." Metacritic, which uses a weighted average, assigned the film a score of 90 out of 100 based on 30 critics, indicating "universal acclaim". Audiences polled by CinemaScore gave the film an average grade of "B" on an A+ to F scale.

Giving the film a perfect four star score, Roger Ebert compared it to Forrest Gump, claiming that the film had the right balance of comedy and drama. He was also impressed with Jim Carrey's dramatic performance. Kenneth Turan of the Los Angeles Times wrote, "The Truman Show is emotionally involving without losing the ability to raise sharp satiric questions as well as get numerous laughs. The rare film that is disturbing despite working beautifully within standard industry norms." He would name it the best movie of 1998. In June 2010, Entertainment Weekly named Truman one of the 100 Greatest Characters of the Last 20 Years.

James Berardinelli liked the film's approach of "not being the casual summer blockbuster with special effects", and he likened Carrey's "[charismatic], understated and effective" performance to those of Tom Hanks and James Stewart. Jonathan Rosenbaum of the Chicago Reader wrote, "Undeniably provocative and reasonably entertaining, The Truman Show is one of those high-concept movies whose concept is both clever and dumb." Tom Meek of Film Threat said the film was not funny enough but still found "something rewarding in its quirky demeanor".

Accolades

The film is recognized by American Film Institute in these lists:
 2006: AFI's 100 Years...100 Cheers – Nominated

The Truman Show delusion

Joel Gold, a psychiatrist at the Bellevue Hospital Center, revealed that by 2008, he had met five patients with schizophrenia (and had heard of another twelve) who believed their lives were reality television shows. Gold named the syndrome "The Truman Show delusion" after the film and attributed the delusion to a world that had become hungry for publicity. Gold stated that some patients were rendered happy by their disease, while "others were tormented". One traveled to New York to check whether the World Trade Center had actually fallen—believing the 9/11 attacks to be an elaborate plot twist in his personal storyline. Another came to climb the Statue of Liberty, believing that he would be reunited with his high school girlfriend at the top and finally be released from the show.

In August 2008, the British Journal of Psychiatry reported similar cases in the United Kingdom. The delusion has informally been referred to as "Truman syndrome", according to an Associated Press story from 2008.

After hearing about the condition, Andrew Niccol, writer of The Truman Show, said: "You know you've made it when you have a disease named after you."

See also

Articles
 List of films featuring surveillance
 Potemkin village
 Simulated reality in fiction

Media
"They", a 1941 story by Robert A. Heinlein 
 Time Out of Joint, 1959 novel by Philip K. Dick
 36 Hours, 1965 film
 The Prisoner, 1967 television series
 "Special Service" a 1989 episode of The Twilight Zone (1985 series)
 EDtv, 1999 film
 Disturbia, 2007 film
 "White Bear", 2013 episode of Black Mirror
 Free Guy, 2021 film

References

External links

 
 
 
 
 
 The Truman Show screenplay
 
 
 

1998 films
1990s satirical films
1990s science fiction comedy-drama films
1998 comedy films
1998 drama films
American science fiction comedy-drama films
American satirical films
BAFTA winners (films)
American black comedy films
American dystopian films
European Film Awards winners (films)
Fictional television shows
Self-reflexive films
Existentialist films
Films scored by Philip Glass
Films about actors
Films about technological impact
Films about television
Films directed by Peter Weir
Films featuring a Best Drama Actor Golden Globe winning performance
Films featuring a Best Supporting Actor Golden Globe winning performance
Films produced by Scott Rudin
Films set in 1996
Films set in California
Films shot in Florida
Films shot in Los Angeles
Films whose director won the Best Direction BAFTA Award
Films whose writer won the Best Original Screenplay BAFTA Award
Hugo Award for Best Dramatic Presentation winning works
Paramount Pictures films
Religion in science fiction
Films produced by Edward S. Feldman
1990s psychological drama films
American psychological drama films
1990s English-language films
1990s American films
Films with screenplays by Andrew Niccol